The history of Wallonia, from prehistoric times to the present day, is that of a territory which, since 1970, has approximately coincided with the territory of Wallonia, a federated component of Belgium, which also includes the smaller German-speaking Community of Belgium (73,000 inhabitants). Wallonia is the name colloquially given to the Walloon Region. The French word Wallonie comes from the term Wallon, itself coming from Walh. Walh is a very old Germanic word used to refer to a speaker of Celtic or Latin (cf. Wales).

Prehistory

I. bernissartensis, that lived from the Barremian to the early Aptian (Early Cretaceous) in Europe, between about 130 and 120 million years ago.

The Grotte de Spy (Spy Cave) is located near Spy, Belgium, in the Walloon municipality of Jemeppe-sur-Sambre in the province of Namur. It was discovered in 1886 and has been classified as Wallonia's Major Heritage. It is one of the most important paleolithic sites in Europe. The excavation was conducted by Marcel de Puydt and Max Lohest of Liège. They proved the existence of the Neanderthal. Fraipont published an article about the cave in the American Anthropologist.

Spiennes, another famous Walloon village in the municipality of Mons, Province of Hainaut, has 
well known neolithic flint mines that are included on UNESCO's list of World Heritage Sites. The entry on the list describes them as "the largest and earliest concentration of ancient mines in Europe" and cites the level of early technological development they demonstrate as justification for their inclusion.

Antiquity

According to the region's official website, after Julius Caesar conquered Gaul, its inhabitants became the Gallo-Romans and were called the "Walha" by their Germanic neighbours, from whence the name Wallonia comes. The Walha started speaking Vulgar Latin instead of their Celtic dialects. At that time, Wallonia was on the border between Germanic-speaking and Latin-speaking territories. Historian Léopold Genicot wrote in his review Toudi n° 1, 1987, p." of an "enclave" in "the area of the Germanic languages". According to Hervé Hasquin,  described the Walloon territory as "a kind of  isthmus" connecting old France and old Germany.

Félix Rousseau said Wallonia has always been a Romance land since the Gallic Wars and constitutes a Latin avant-garde in Germanic Europe. In his book La Wallonie, Terre Romane (Wallonia, a Romance Land) he says:
For centuries, the land of the Walloons has been and has never ceased to be a Romance land. That is the capital fact of the history of the Walloons that explains their ways of thought, feeling, and belief. Moreover, in the whole Romance world, the land of the Walloons, caught between Germanic territories, occupies a special position, the position of a vanguard. In fact a border about 300km long separates these extremi Latini from the Flemish to the North and from the Germans to the East.

According to Genicot, the most remarkable evidence of the Romance identity of Wallonia is the Sequence of Saint Eulalia because of its traits of Walloon, Picard, Lorrain, which may have been located in Wallonia or adjacent to it. Its origin must be located "in a region between Tournai and Liège, and it was written around 880".

The longue durée event of the language border

According to Fernand Braudel, the most important event of Walloon historyand that of Belgian historyis the Barbarian invasions, which he says is an interesting example of the longue durée event. Braudel wrote that the result of the Germanic invasionsthe language borderis "a contemporary and living circumstance" and that "Belgium divided into two parts along a language border".  This border, separating the Germanic and Roman sprachraums, moved over the centuries preceding the establishment of the Belgian state over an area between the Ardennes and the line from Aachen to Calais and the more sparsely populated frontier from Aachen to Arlon via Malmedy. This frontier has not much changed since the 18th century. Flanders is to the north of the line and Wallonia to the south. According to Kenneth D. McRae, this language border "acquired administrative significance for the first time in 1822 with [William I of the Netherlands'] legislation on the use of Dutch in Flemish communes".

Industry

The Ardennes is an old mountain mass formed during the Hercynian orogeny. At the bottom of these old mountains, coal, iron, zinc, and other metals are often found in the sub-soil. In the north and west of the Ardennes lie the valleys of the Sambre and Meuse rivers, forming the Sillon industriel, an arc stretching across the most industrial provinces of Wallonia, Hainaut, along the river Haine, the Borinage, the Centre and Charleroi along the river Sambre and Liège along the river Meuse.  This geological region is at the origin of the economy, the history, and the geography of Wallonia. "Wallonia presents a wide range of rocks of various ages. Some geological stages internationally recognized were defined from rock sites located in Wallonia, e.g. Frasnian (Frasnes-lez-Couvin), Famennian (Famenne), Tournaisian (Tournai), Viséan (Visé), Dinantian (Dinant) and Namurian (Namur)." The Tournaisian excepted, all these rocks are in the geological area of Ardennes.

The Ardennes includes the greatest part of the Belgian province of Luxembourg, the south of the province of Namur, the province of Liège, and a very small part of Hainaut. The first furnaces in the four Walloon provinces were in this area, before the 18th century using charcoal made in the Ardennes forest. This industry was also found in Gaume in the south of the province of Luxembourg. After the 18th century, the most important part of the Walloon steel industry, now using coal, was built around the coal mines, principally around the cities of Liège, Charleroi, La Louvière, the Borinage, and also in Walloon Brabant in Tubize. Wallonia became the second industrial power of the world, in proportion to its territory and to its population.

The Industrial Revolution in the Sillon industriel embraced four industrial basins: Borinage, La Louvièrecalled Centre, Charleroi and Liège, and a semi-industrial basin in Namur. According to Peter N. Stearns, the area was an important centre for iron manufacture for the Roman Empire. After the empire's fall, brass and bronze became favourable and the centres of metalworking shifted to Huy and the forested areas around Dinant and Chimay.  In the twelfth and thirteenth centuries, the Walloon method, involving the use of a blast furnace, was developed in Liége, making it possible to substitute bronze with iron. The few coal mines around Liège, Charleroi, and the Borinage produced coal for breweries, dyeworks, soap and brick factories, and in the fourteenth century by the glassmaking industry in the Charleroi basin. At that time, coal mining was a part-time activity carried on by rural peasants to supplement their incomes.

The Walloon process in the Middle Ages 
During the Late Middle Ages, the demand for iron for artillery caused important technological developments in iron working to occur in Wallonia, especially in the County of Namur, County of Hainaut, and Principality of Liège; this was called the Walloon process. It consists of making pig iron in a blast furnace, then refining it in a finery forge.  The process was devised in the Liège region and spread into France and thence from the Pays de Bray to England before the end of the 15th century.  Louis de Geer took it to Roslagen, Sweden, in the early 17th century, where he employed Walloon ironmakers. Iron made there by this method was known in England as oregrounds iron.

The beginning of the Industrial Revolution

Peter N. Stearns wrote that the development of the puddling process and the improvement of the blast furnace after 1750 accelerated the substitution of coke for charcoal. The first puddling furnace in Belgium was installed in 1821, and two years later the first coke-fed blast furnace was installed there. By 1870, except in a few small establishments in Luxembourg and Namur, the extensive use of charcoal in metalworking had been discontinued. Metal production moved from forests close to the coal-producing areas Charleroi and Liège.  Newcomen-type steampumps were used in mines near Liège by 1723 and at Charleroi by 1725. The first steam engines based on James Watt's modifications appeared about 1803 in a Liège cannon foundry. The two engines installed there was producing 100,000 horsepower by 1860.

Second industrial power of the world 

Jean-Pierre Rioux quoted  the following table in his book La révolution industrielle (The Industrial Revolution) based on several "levels of development"; consumption of cotton in the rough state, of cast iron, cast steel, coal, and the development of the railway network.  It was first drawn by Paul Bairoch, one of the most important post-1945 economists. This table is not based on absolute figures, nor does it point out absolute ranks, but the hierarchy of the industrial powers is based on their levels of development. "Wallonia" may be substituted for "Belgium".

According to Herbert Lüthy, quoted by Maurice Besnard said Belgium and its Walloon part was "the first country to become an industrial country after England". Herbert Lüthy did not agree with the theory of Max Weber on the link between capitalism and Protestantism and emphasised the fact that Wallonia was a Catholic country.  Philippe Destatte wrote that Wallonia was "the second industrial power of the world, in proportion to its population and its territory".

Hervé Hasquin said, "the development of the Walloon industrial regions contributed to make Belgium one of the main industrial powers in Europe, if not in the world ..." Philippe Raxhon wrote that after 1830, "the Walloon regions were becoming the second industrial power in the world after England". Marc Reynebau said the same thing.

According to Michel De Coster, a professor at the University of Liège, "The historians and the economists say that Belgium was the second industrial power of the world, in proportion to its population and its territory ... [b]ut this rank is that of Wallonia, where were concentrated the coal-mines, the blast furnaces, the iron and zinc factories, the wool industry, the glass industry, the weapons industry ... " According to Wallonia Foreign Trade and Investment Agency, "The Walloon iron and steel industry came to be regarded as an example of the radical evolution of industrial expansion. Thanks to coal ... the region geared up to become the second industrial power in the world after England ... in 1833 Belgian industry boasted 5 times more steam machines per inhabitant than a country such as France. It also exported them to over 25 countries." European Route of Industrial Heritage said, "The sole industrial centre outside the collieries and blast furnaces of Walloon was the old cloth making town of Ghent".

Dependence on Brussels 

Michel Quévit wrote that Wallonia has been a prosperous country dependent on the financial powers in Brussels. When arriving at the end of the first stage of the industrial revolution, Walloon captains of industry took huge risks because of the  large increase of their production. The result was that the High Bank in Brussels acquired very important financial participation in the Walloon companies, and in 1847 Brussels became the dominant centre of Belgian territory".

Herman Van der Wee said Wallonia's status as Belgium's industrial heartland was "due to factors on the supply side and to a fortuitous boom in exporting coal to France [and] to the export demand for pig iron, for intermediate finished metal products, for steam engines, locomotives and other transportation equipment [which was largely determined by] the Railway Revolution and the ensuing railway boom." He also said, " ... because ... Wallonia’s heavy industry had an undeniable technological lead over its French and German counterparts, and because it had a clear locational advantage vis-à-vis British competition, the first phase of industrialization in Germany and France became very dependent upon exports from Wallonia".

According to Van der Wee, "Antwerp's harbor benefited from the shift of Wallonia’s exports to the sea route and from the rising transit trade with Germany and France". At the end of the nineteenth century, the port began attracting industrial investment based on its advantageous location. The industrialisation of Antwerp and the diffusion of the mechanized textile industry from Ghent to the rest of Flanders was not enough to shift the balance of industrial power northwards, and this shift did not occur until after the Second World War.

After the Second World War, investment in colonial mining and transportation ceased and Belgium became a more affluent society. Industrial investment shifted towards consumer durables and traditional Brussels holding companies lost their grip on Belgian industry to American multinationals, German mixed banks and to other financially independent European companies. The need for external funds was increasing but the control of the new industrial sectors increasingly shifted into the hands of foreign investors.

Political dependence on the north

In 1930, the language of Belgium's elites, government, monarchy, and bourgeoisie, was French; they favoured the southern part of Belgium over the northern part. Francophone elites at the head of companies, industry and politics came from both Flanders and Wallonia. Wallonia found this to be a disadvantage. According to Philippe Destatte, "In the history of Belgium, the legislative elections held on 11 June 1884 represent a pivotal point, for the total victory of the Catholic Party over Walthère Frère-Orban's Liberals opened the way for thirty years of homogeneous governments, thirty years of domination by that party, whose main power was in Flanders. Above all, this 1884 victory had the effectto quote Robert Demoulinof shifting the country's political centre of gravity from the South to the North."

Jules Destrée, an important socialist leader of Charleroi, reacted against this situation by writing his Lettre au roi sur la séparation de la Wallonie et de la Flandre. The President of the POB, Emile Vandervelde, said, "The Walloon populations are tired of seeing themselves crushed by an artificial majority formed by the Flemish part of the country".

Industrial relations

According to Tony Cliff, Belgium has a tradition of general strikes. A series of strikes occurred in 1886, beginning in Charleroi then moving to Liege and into the Walloon provinces. The strikers demanded universal suffrage, and in some places there were economic demands. In May 1891, 125,000 workers struck to demand electoral reforms, and a similar strike occurred in April 1893, when 250,000 workers struck. Further strikes demanding electoral reform occurred in 1902 and 1913. In 1936, workers successfully struck to demand a forty-hour working week and paid holidays. A general strike in 1950 led to the abdication of King Leopold. Coal miners in the Borinage began a general strike in 1958-9  to demand the nationalisation of the mining industry and increased wages.

Belgium was dominated by a Francophone elite from Brussels, Flanders and Wallonia.  wrote: "It is true that the Walloon movement, which has never stopped affirming that Wallonia is part of the French cultural area, has never made this cultural struggle a priority, being more concerned to struggle against its status as a political minority and the economic decline which was only a corollary to it." Jules Destrée fought against this situation; the Wallonian people were always a minority in Belgium, first dominated by the French-speaking elite and afterwards by the Dutch-speaking elite. André Renard became the leader of the 1960–61 Winter General Strike to demand a self-governing Wallonia.

Walloon decline versus reconversion
According to the website "Portal Wallonia", the effect of the two world wars was to curb economic growth in Wallonia. By 1958, the region's dwindling coal reserves were becoming increasingly expensive to extract and the factories were becoming outdated. Wallonia needed to redefine its role as Belgium's industrial heartland; it turned to the technology sector.

The December 1960 general strike succeeded only in Wallonia, where it became a Renardist strike. According to Renée Fox, a major reversal in the relationship between Flanders and Wallonia was underway. Flanders had entered a period of vigorous industrialization, and a significant percentage of the foreign capital entering Belgium to support new industriesparticularly from the United Stateswas being invested in Flanders. In contrast, Wallonia's coal mines and outdated steel plants and factories were in crisis, and the region's unemployment was rising and investment capital was falling. According to Fox, an unpwardly mobile, Dutch-speaking, "populist bourgeoisie" was becoming visible and vocal in both Flemish movements and in local and national policy. The strike was originally against the austerity law of Gaston Eyskens, but became "a collective expression of the frustrations, anxieties, and grievances that Wallonia was experiencing in response to its altered situation, and by the demands [for] regional autonomy for Wallonia ... "

In 2012, four former industrial sites, the Major Mining Sites of Wallonia, were recognized by UNESCO as world heritage sites.

, Wallonia displays interregional cooperation with its neighbours, centres of excellence and-state-of-the-art technologies and business parks. The Region is not yet at the level of Flanders, however, and is suffering many difficulties. Nevertheless, forty Walloon companies are number one in Wallonia and worldwide, according to the Union Wallonne des Entreprises, for instance in glass production, lime and limestone production, cyclotrons, and the aviation industry,.

Culture

The Manifesto for Walloon culture published in 1983 is also an important event in Walloon history.

See also 
 History of the Walloon Movement
 History of Belgium
 Renardism
 Huguenots

References

Bibliography

 Ramon Arango, Leopold III and the Belgian Royal Question, The Johns Hopkins Press, Baltimore, 1961.
 Léopold Genicot (ed.), Histoire de la Wallonie, Privat, Toulouse, 1973.
 Hervé Hasquin (ed.), La Wallonie, le pays et les hommes. Histoire. Écomonie; Sociétés, Tome I and Tome II, La Renaissance du Livre, Brussels, 1975 and 1980.
 Rita Lejeune and Jacques Stiennon (eds.), La Wallonie, le Pays et les Hommes: Lettres – Arts – Culture, 4 vols, La Renaissance du Livre, Brussels, 1978–1981.
 Kenneth D. McRae, Conflict and Compromise in Multilingual Societies: Belgium, Wilfrid Laurier University Press (1 January 1986), .
 Renée C. Fox, In the Belgian Château, Ivan R. Dee, Chicago, 1994, p. 13 .
 Jan Velaers and Herman Van Goethem, Leopold III, de Koning, het Land, de Oorlog, Lannoo, Tielt, 1994, .
 Philippe Destatte, L'identité wallonne, Institut Destrée, Charleroi, 1997. .
 Carl Strikwerda, A House Divided: Catholics, Socialists, and Flemish Nationalists in Nineteenth-Century Belgium, Rowman & Littlefield, Laham, Oxford, 1997, p. 109, .
 Astrid Von Busekist,Politique des langues et construction de l'État, Éd. Duculot, Gembloux, 1998. .
 Louis Vos, Nationalism in Belgium, Macmillan Press, London, 1998, St. Martin's Press, New York, 1998, .
 Alan S. Milward, The European Rescue of the Nation-State, Routledge, London, 2000, p. 41, .
 Paul Delforge (ed.), Encyclopédie du Mouvement wallon, Tome I, II and III, Institut Destrée, Charleroi, 2000 and 2001.
 Robert Halleux, Cockerill, Deux siècles de technologie, Editions du Perron, Liège, 2002.
 Luc Courtois and Jean Pirottte, De fer et de feu, l'émigration walllonne vers la Suède, Fondation Humblet, Louvain-la-neuve, 2003.
 Bruno Demoulin and Jean-Louis Kupper (eds.), Histoire de la Wallonie de la préhistoire au XXIe siècle, Privat, Toulouse, 2004.
 Pierre Tilly, André Renard, Far et Le Cri, Brussels, Liège, 2005. .
 Yves Quairiaux, L'image du Flamand en Wallonie, Labor, Brussels, 2006.
 Michel De Coster, Les enjeux des conflits linguistiques, L'Harmattan, Paris, 2007, .
 Luc Courtois, Jean-Pierre Delville, Françoise Rosart and Guy Zélis (eds.), Images et paysages mentaux des xixe siècle et xxe siècle de la Wallonie à l'Outre-Mer - Hommage au professeur Jean Pirotte à l'occasion de son éméritat, Academia Bruylant, Presses Universitaires de l'UCL, Louvain-la-Neuve, 2007. .
 Paul Delforge, La Wallonie et la première guerre mondiale. Pour une histoire de la séparation administrative, Institut Jules Destrée, Namur, 2009.
 Els Witte, Jan Craeybeckx, Alain Meynen, Political History of Belgium: From 1830 onwards, Academic and Scientific Publishers, Brussels, 2009, p. 240. .
 , La terre promise. Flamands en Wallonie, Le castor astral, Brussels, 2010.
 Michel Quévit, Flandre-Wallonie. Quelle solidarité? De la création de l'Etat belge à l'Europe des Régions, Charleroi, 2010. .

External links

 
Wallonia's Major Heritage